Robert Indiana's pop art Love design was originally produced as a print for a Museum of Modern Art Christmas card in 1965. The first LOVE sculpture, in Indianapolis, was made in 1970. Since then, it has been released in many different incarnations and sculptural versions now appear in urban centers around the globe. Variants employ the Hebrew, Chinese, Italian and Spanish languages.

Versions of Love in the United States
 AR – Bentonville – Art Trail outside the Crystal Bridges Museum of American Art in Bentonville, Arkansas
 AZ – Scottsdale – Scottsdale Civic Center in Scottsdale, Arizona
 CA – Palos Verdes Estates – Chadwick School campus in Palos Verdes Estates, California
 CA – Rosemead – Panda Restaurant Group in Rosemead, California
 CA – San Francisco – San Francisco Museum of Modern Art in San Francisco, California
 CA – San Francisco – Tennis court behind the abandoned Public Health Service Hospital at the Nike Missile Site SF-89L in San Francisco, California
 CT - Bristol - Bell City Diner location confirmed April 2021
 D.C. – AMOR in the National Gallery of Art Sculpture Garden in Washington D.C.
 FL – Town of Bay Harbor Islands – In the median of 96th Street in front of a cigar store and medical office in Bay Harbor Islands, Florida
 FL - South Beach - Outside Kimpton Angler's Hotel confirmed April 2022
 IA – Des Moines – Pappajohn Sculpture Park in Des Moines, Iowa
 IN – Indianapolis – Indianapolis Museum of Art, Indianapolis, Indiana – The original sculpture version is now inside the museum
 IN – New Castle – in Arts Park by the Art Association of Henry County in New Castle, Indiana (Robert Indiana's hometown) – LOVE sculpture is "likeness" only
 IN – New Castle – corner of Grand Avenue and 15th Street in New Castle, Indiana (Robert Indiana's hometown) – LOVE sculpture is "likeness" only
 KS – Wichita – on Wichita State University campus in Wichita, Kansas near/in the middle of the Heskett Center, Lindquist Hall, and Grace Wilkie Hall buildings
 LA – New Orleans – New Orleans Museum of Art's sculpture garden in New Orleans, Louisiana
 ME – Rockland – inside Farnsworth Art Museum in Rockland, Maine
 ME – Vinalhaven – in Chinese in front of Indiana's residence, the Star of Hope, on Vinalhaven Island
 MI – Grand Rapids – Louis Campau Promenade in Downtown Grand Rapids, Michigan
 MN – Minneapolis – Minneapolis Sculpture Garden in Minneapolis, Minnesota
 NY – Brooklyn – Pratt Institute campus in Brooklyn, New York Visited in 2016, was not on display
 NY – Buffalo – may be in Albright-Knox Gallery at 1285 Elmwood Avenue
 NY – NYC – Kasmin Gallery displaying three blocks: AHAVA, LOVE, AMOR on top of a building along the High Line at 27th Street and one LOVE block with lights inside the gallery
 NY – NYC – Sixth Avenue, on the southeast corner of West 55th Street in New York City, New York
 OK – Norman – sculpture sits outside in front of the Visitor Center building on the campus of University of Oklahoma in Norman, Oklahoma
 OR – Portland – temporary installation at Lewis & Clark College, adjacent to Howard Hall. Courtesy of the Zarnegin Family Foundation.
 PA – Bethlehem – E.W. Fairchild-Martindale Library, Lehigh University Asa Packer Campus in Bethlehem, Pennsylvania – LOVE sculpture is "likeness" only
 PA – Collegeville – sculpture sits in front of Wismer Center on Ursinus College campus in Collegeville, Pennsylvania – the large (comparable to the sculptures in NYC and Indianapolis) LOVE sculpture is a "likeness" only, authorized by Robert Indiana, but not built by him, as confirmed by the assistant curator
 PA – Philadelphia – corner of Love Park (John F. Kennedy Plaza) in Philadelphia, Pennsylvania
 PA – Philadelphia – AMOR sculpture is on the corner of Sister Cities Park (a part of Logan Circle), across from the Catholic Cathedral Basilica of Saints Peter and Paul in Philadelphia, Pennsylvania
 PA – Philadelphia – sculpture sits on a pedestal near 36th Street and Locust Walk on the University of Pennsylvania campus in Philadelphia, Pennsylvania
 TX – San Antonio – McNay Art Museum in San Antonio, Texas
 TX – University Park – sculpture is near a small pond at Williams Park (located on Turtle Creek, east of Preston Road on University Boulevard) in University Park, Texas
 UT – Provo – Brigham Young University Museum of Art in Provo, Utah
 VT – Middlebury – sculpture is outside the college art museum near a small pond on Middlebury College campus in Middlebury, Vermont
 WI – Milwaukee – installed on the outdoor east patio of the Milwaukee Art Museum facing Lake Michigan, in downtown Milwaukee, Wisconsin

Versions of Love in Canada
 Hamilton – Ontario – Near "Central Park" development on Rymal Road in Hamilton, Ontario
 Montreal – Quebec – sculpture is encircled by a two-foot tall plexiglass panel – Old Montreal in front of Lhotel 262 Saint Jacques Street West in Montreal, Quebec
 Vancouver – British Columbia – Outside 1445 West Georgia Street in Vancouver, British Columbia – this gallery has closed and the sculpture moved

Versions of Love in Europe

 Armenia – Yerevan – Yerevan Cascade in Yerevan, Armenia
 England – Derbyshire – Chatsworth in Derbyshire, England, as part of the Sotheby's Beyond Limits exhibition, 2008
 England – London – Bishopsgate and Wormwood Street, City of London, England (southwest corner) –– temporary exhibit, May 2013 – June 2014
 Georgia – Tbilisi – Bidzina Ivanishvili palace in Tbilisi, Georgia
 Germany - Berlin - Hamburger Bahnhof Museum für Gegenwart in Berlin, Germany
 Portugal – Lisbon – Rossio Square (Praça do Rossio) in Lisbon, Portugal
 Spain – Bilbao – Plaza del Sagrado Corazón in Bilbao, Spain
 Switzerland – Martigny – Fondation Pierre Gianadda in Martigny, Switzerland
 Turkey – Istanbul – Nişantaşı in Istanbul, Turkey

Versions of Love in Asia
 China – Hong Kong – World Trade Centre in Hong Kong, China (taken down)
 China – Shanghai – Zendai Museum of Modern Art in Shanghai, China
 India – Mumbai – Antilia in Mumbai, India (inside the private building; not open to the public)
 Indonesia – Bandung – Love Lock in Bandung City Hall, Bandung, Indonesia
 Indonesia – Jakarta – Gandaria City in Jakarta, Indonesia
 Israel - Jerusalem – Love sculpture in Hebrew is displayed at the Israel Museum
 Japan – Chiba – In a roundabout in Chiba, Chiba, Japan
 Japan – Tokyo – Shinjuku I-Land Tower in Nishi-Shinjuku office district in Tokyo, Japan
 Kyrgyzstan – Bishkek – Love Park in Bishkek, Kyrgyzstan, since July 2009
 Malaysia – Melacca City – In front of Christ Church in Melacca City, Malaysia
 Philippines – Naga City, Camarines Sur – Magsaysay Avenue in Naga, Camarines Sur, Philippines
 Philippines – Naga City, Cebu – Baywalk in Naga, Cebu, Philippines
 Philippines – Quezon City – Eastwood City in Quezon City, Philippines
 Sabah Malaysia – Kota Kinabalu – Sabah Surya in Kota Kinabalu, Sabah Malaysia
 Singapore – Winsland Plaza (between Winsland House I & II) in Singapore
 South Korea – Seoul – LOVE (Blue) in Myeong-dong, Seoul, South Korea
 South Korea – Osan – Amorepacific Corporation factory (indoor) in Osan, South Korea
 South Korea – Yongin – Amorepacific Museum of Art in Yongin, South Korea (LOVE installations on site, playing on the LOVE theme)
 Taiwan – Taipei – Taipei 101 in Taipei, Taiwan (also inside displays Indiana's 1-0)
 Thailand – Bangkok – CentralWorld shopping plaza and complex in Bangkok, Thailand (in the ZEN store; destroyed by the fire during the 2010 Thai political protests)

Versions of Love in South America

 Colombia – Bogota – Parque metropolitano El Lago in Bogotá, Colombia
 Colombia – Neiva – Neiva, Colombia

Versions of Love in other languages
Updated and edited as of 08/23/19
 D.C. – AMOR is displayed at the National Gallery of Art Sculpture Garden in Washington, D.C.
 Italy – Milan – An Indiana sculpture showing the Italian word for love was displayed outside the Galleria Vittorio Emanuele II on Piazza della Scala in Milan, Italy. This sculpture is no longer there (visited 12 May 2016)
 Jerusalem – An Indiana sculpture showing the Hebrew word for love (ahava) is displayed at the Israel Museum in Jerusalem
 NY – NYC – Kasmin Gallery displaying three (3) blocks: AHAVA, LOVE, AMOR on top of a building along the High Line at 27th Street
 PA – Philadelphia – AMOR sculpture is on the corner of Sister Cities Park in Philadelphia, Pennsylvania

References

Love
Outdoor sculptures
pop culture
Public art
Steel sculptures
Love